Per Oskar "Pelle" Svensson (6 February 1943 – 17 December 2020) was a Swedish Greco-Roman wrestler and lawyer. His achievements included a silver medal at the 1964 Summer Olympics in the light heavyweight class and two gold medals at the World Championships in 1970 and 1971.

Wrestling career 
Svensson, who started his career in wrestling in 1955, competed for the clubs Sundsvalls AIK and Heby BK. He won the Swedish Championships for the first time in 1962, competing in the 100 kg class. He won the Swedish Championships for thirteen consecutive years until his retirement in 1974. He competed at the World Championships for the first time in 1963, ending up fourth. At the 1964 Summer Olympics held in Tokyo, Japan, Svensson won a silver medal in the light heavyweight class. He also won two gold medals at the European Championships in 1969 and 1970 and two gold medals at the World Championships in 1970 and 1971, as well as three bronze medals at the European Championships in 1966, 1967, and 1968. As a wrestler he was nicknamed Pelle Swing in Sweden.

Svensson was chairman of the Swedish Wrestling Federation from 1993 to 1998, and a member of the board of the International Federation of Associated Wrestling Styles (FILA) from 1990 to 2007. Svensson left his position as a member of the board of the FILA in protest of what he saw as a lack of willingness on the part of the FILA to fight corruption within the sport.

Legal career 
Following his career in wrestling, Svensson pursued a career as a lawyer and was noted for taking on several high-profile criminal cases. He first received attention when he filed a civil suit against a suspected murderer in the case of the disappearance of an eleven-year-old boy north of Sundsvall in 1980 (known in Sweden as Johanfallet, "the Johan Case"), together with the parents of the boy. The case ultimately ended in loss in the court of appeal, which ordered the parents to pay the court costs, and Svensson was criticized and accused of taking the case in order to receive media attention.

In 1988, Svensson served as the defense attorney for Juha Valjakkala, who was later convicted of the murder of three people in the village of Åmsele (known in Sweden as Åmselemorden, "the Åmsele Murders") earlier in the same year. In 2005 he wrote the book Utan nåd : grymhet utan gräns ("Without Mercy – Cruelty Beyond Limit") about the case.

Svensson also served as the defense attorney to Lars Tingström (known in Sweden by the nickname Bombmannen, "the Bomb-Man"), who was later convicted of three bomb attacks around Stockholm. In 1996, Svensson published parts of what he said was a testament authored by Tingström shortly before his death in 1993. In the purported testament, Tingström wrote that he had given Christer Pettersson the instructions to assassinate Swedish Prime Minister Olof Palme. The journalist Gunnar Wall wrote an article in Dagens Nyheter where he accused Svensson of manipulating the testament from Tingström. A forensic investigation later proved the testament to be real. Svensson's information led the prosecutors to file an application for a new trial against Pettersson for the assassination of Palme, but this was rejected by the Supreme Court.

Svensson ended his career as a lawyer after  occupational burnout, but continued to take cases after his retirement.

Personal life 

Svensson was married and had three children. He lived in the small village of Njurunda outside Sundsvall in Västernorrland County.

Svensson died on 17 December 2020 after suffering from cancer. He was 77.

Wrestling achievements

Bibliography

References 

1943 births
2020 deaths
People from Sollefteå Municipality
Olympic wrestlers of Sweden
Olympic silver medalists for Sweden
Wrestlers at the 1964 Summer Olympics
Wrestlers at the 1968 Summer Olympics
Wrestlers at the 1972 Summer Olympics
Swedish male sport wrestlers
20th-century Swedish lawyers
World Wrestling Championships medalists
Medalists at the 1964 Summer Olympics
European Wrestling Championships medalists
Deaths from cancer in Sweden
Sportspeople from Västernorrland County